The following lists events that happened during 1816 in New Zealand.

Incumbents

Regal and viceregal
Head of State – King George III. With Prince George, Prince of Wales as prince regent.
Governor of New South Wales – Lachlan Macquarie

Events 
22 January – Large numbers of Māori from North Cape, Whangaroa and Thames visit the mission at Rangihoua.
February – Thomas and Elizabeth Hansen arrive at Oihi, Rangihoua from Port Jackson on the Active. They are the first non-missionary European family to settle in New Zealand. They eventually raised 11 children who all lived to at least their late 60s.
March – Tui and Tītore, who arrived the previous year, leave Port Jackson (Sydney) for England in HMS Kangaroo. While there they may have helped Professor Samuel Lee start his Maori dictionary.
16 August – Thomas Kendall starts the first school in New Zealand, at Rangihoua. The opening roll is 33.

Births
 31 July (in Ireland): Trevor Chute, leader of British forces in the Second Taranaki War.
Undated

 William Daldy, politician
 (in England): Edward Dobson, Canterbury provincial engineer
William Guyton, Mayor of Wellington
John Wheeler King, the first European male born in New Zealand to reach adulthood
 Henry Tancred, politician

Deaths
approximate
 Charlotte Badger; one of the first two female settlers in New Zealand.

See also
List of years in New Zealand
Timeline of New Zealand history
History of New Zealand
Military history of New Zealand
Timeline of the New Zealand environment
Timeline of New Zealand's links with Antarctica

References